DIN 41612 was a DIN standard for electrical connectors that are widely used in rack based electrical systems. Standardisation of the connectors is a pre-requisite for open systems, where users expect components from different suppliers to operate together. The most widely known use of DIN 41612 connectors is in the VMEbus and NuBus systems. The standard has withdrawn in favor of international standards IEC 60603-2 and  EN 60603-2.

DIN 41612 connectors are used in Pancon, STEbus,
Futurebus, VMEbus, Multibus II, NuBus, VXI Bus,
eurocard  TRAM motherboards,
and Europe Card Bus,
all of which typically use male DIN 41612 connectors on Eurocards plugged into female DIN 41612 on the backplane in a 19-inch rack chassis.

Mechanical details
The standard describes connectors which may have one, two or three rows of contacts, which are labelled as rows a, b and c. Two row connectors may use rows a+b or rows a+c. The connectors may have 16 or 32 columns, which means that the possible permutations allow 16, 32, 48, 64 or 96 contacts. The rows and columns are on a 0.1 inch (2.54 mm) grid pitch. Insertion and removal force are controlled, and three durability grades are available.

Often the female DIN 41612 connectors have press fit contacts rather than solder pin contacts, to avoid thermal shock to the backplane.

Electrical details
The headline performance of the connectors is a 2 amp per pin current carrying capacity, and 500 volt working voltage. Both these figures may need to be de-rated according to safety requirements or environmental conditions.

Performance Classes
The DIN 41612 specification identifies 3 different classes or "levels"; it's more complicated than this, but, essentially: class 1 is good for 500 mating cycles; class 2 is good for 400 mating cycles, and, class 3 is good for 50 mating cycles.

References

External links
 VME Bus Connector Mechanical Dimensions

41612
Electrical signal connectors